The UTEP Open Source Research Lab's goal is to build the most comprehensive unclassified database on group-based violence in the Western Hemisphere. It performs open source research, exploitation, and analysis of transnational criminal activities including:
 Cartel-related violence
 Cross-border violence
 Immigration-related extremist activities
 Immigration-related terrorist activities
 Narcotics trafficking
 Transnational organized crime activity

The region that the Open Source Research Lab focuses on is in Mexico and along the US border with Mexico, and Latin America.

Criticism
The lab is under scrutiny because it was started and run until recently by S. Fernando Rodriguez, then director of UTEP's Criminal Justice Program. Rodriguez is on paid administrative leave while administrators decide what to do because he did not report outside work worth more than $1 million as required by university rules.

References

External links
 - dead link 23:36, 14 November 2018 (UTC)

University of Texas at El Paso